Emma Lunder (born September 2, 1991) is a Canadian biathlete from North Vancouver, British Columbia.

Career

Olympics
In January 2018, Lunder was named to Canada's 2018 Olympic team.

In January 2022, Lunder was named to Canada's 2022 Olympic team.

IBU Cup
During the 2015–16 Biathlon IBU Cup series, Lunder won a silver medal in the 7.5 sprint race in Canmore, Alberta.

Biathlon results
All results are sourced from the International Biathlon Union.

Olympic Games

World Championships

*During Olympic seasons competitions are only held for those events not included in the Olympic program.
**The mixed relay was added as an event in 2005.

References

1991 births
Living people
Canadian female biathletes
Sportspeople from North Vancouver
Olympic biathletes of Canada
Biathletes at the 2018 Winter Olympics
Biathletes at the 2022 Winter Olympics